Lərmərud is a village and municipality in the Lerik Rayon of Azerbaijan.  It has a population of 1,019.

References 

 

Populated places in Lerik District